George Joseph Rung Jr. (May 27, 1916 – September 29, 1996) was an American basketball and baseball player and coach. He coached Fenn College (now Cleveland State University) from 1949 through 1952 and again from 1953 through 1958. He was also the head baseball coach at Fenn College for 1950 and 1951.

Head coaching record

Basketball

References

1916 births
1996 deaths
American men's basketball coaches
American men's basketball players
Baseball players from Cleveland
Basketball coaches from Ohio
Basketball players from Cleveland
Cleveland Allmen Transfers players
Cleveland State Vikings baseball coaches
Cleveland State Vikings men's basketball coaches
Guards (basketball)
Indianapolis Kautskys players
Miami RedHawks baseball players
Miami RedHawks men's basketball players
United States Navy personnel of World War II